Vitoria-Gasteiz railway station is the main railway station in the Basque capital city of Vitoria-Gasteiz in Spain.

Services
Vitoria-Gasteiz railway station is one of the main stops on the Madrid–Hendaye railway. Half a dozen trains each day link the city with Madrid, using Alvia trains on the AVE infrastructure to reach Madrid in 3 hours 43 minutes. There are also connections to Paris, Barcelona, Lisbon and Bordeaux. There is a complete lack of rail services to Andalusia and no direct rail link with Bilbao.

Future
The Basque Y high-speed rail network is planned to connect Vitoria-Gasteiz with the French border, San Sebastián and Bilbao within 35 minutes. However, work on this project has been slow and there is no date for its inaugural run. As part of these works, Vitoria-Gasteiz station will be rebuilt underground.

References

Railway stations in the Basque Country (autonomous community)